Ram Mukerji (18 October 1933 — 22 October 2017) was an Indian film director, producer and screenwriter in Hindi and Bengali cinema. He was one of the founders of Filmalaya Studios, Mumbai. He is most known for his films, Hum Hindustani (1960) and Leader (1964), starring Dilip Kumar and Vyjayanthimala.

He belonged to the Mukerji-Samarth family, as his father Ravindramohan Mukherjee was the elder brother of Sashadhar Mukherjee, and one of the founders of Filmalaya Studios. His wife Krishna Mukherjee is a playback singer, his daughter Rani Mukerji is a noted Bollywood actress, and his son is director Raja Mukerji. Raja Mukerji assisted his father in a few films, before making his acting debut with Bidhatar Khela (2007).

He previously, directed and produced his daughter Rani Mukerji's film debut, Biyer Phool in 1996, and produced her Hindi film debut Raja Ki Aayegi Baraat in 1997. Mukerji died on 22 October 2017 at the age of 84, four days after his 84th birthday.

Filmography

References

External links
 
 
 

1933 births
2017 deaths
20th-century Indian film directors
Hindi-language film directors
Bengali film directors
Film directors from Mumbai
Hindi film producers